is a song recorded by Japanese duo Yoasobi from their second EP, The Book 2 (2021). It was released as a stand-alone digital single on January 20, 2021, through Sony Music Entertainment Japan, and released as a double A-side CD single together with "Kaibutsu" on March 24. The song was featured as an ending theme song for the second season of the anime television series Beastars.

Background and release

After "Kaibutsu" was released, Yoasobi announced to sing the ending theme song for the second season of the anime television series Beastars, titled "Yasashii Suisei". The song was based on the novel , written by Paru Itagaki, who also wrote and illustrated the manga.

"Yasashii Suisei" was released digitally on January 20, 2021, and released as a double A-side CD single, together with "Kaibutsu", titled  on March 24. The single was released in 2 versions: limited edition (anime edition) and fan club limited edition for members of "Club Yoasobi", Yoasobi's official fan club website. Both versions included the original songs, TV size version songs, and non-credit opening and ending video from Beastars. The fan club limited edition also included the acoustic session of "Tabun" and "Ano Yume o Nazotte". 

Later, "Yasashii Suisei" was included on their second EP The Book 2, released on December 1. The English version of the song, titled "Comet" was included on the duo's first English-language EP E-Side, scheduled for release on November 12.

Lyrics and composition

"Yasashii Suisei" is a ballad song with a straightforward message about 2 people from different backgrounds nurturing a beautiful friendship in a cruel world. The song is composed in the key of F major, 90 beats per minute with a running time of 3 minutes and 33 seconds.

Commercial performance

"Yasashii Suisei" debuted at number 20 on the Billboard Japan Hot 100 of February 1, 2021 and peaked at number 19 on the chart of March 31, 2021, and also peaked at number 97 on the Billboard Global Excl. US of February 6.

The CD single "Kaibutsu / Yasashii Suisei" debuted and peaked at number 2 on the Oricon Singles Chart for the chart issue date of April 5, 2021, selling 23,761 copies, and also number 2 on the Billboard Japan Top Single Sales chart, selling 27,275 copies for the chart issue date of March 31, 2021.

Music video

The music video "Yasashii Suisei" was premiered on March 25, 2021. It was directed and produced by Kōhei Kadowaki, who also produced the ending video for the anime Beastars. The music video focuses on the important characters of the anime, Louis and Ibuki, shows the ephemeral and gentle world view which flows between the two is delicate with over 2,500 illustrations drawn by director.

Live performance

"Yasashii Suisei" was performed for the first time on the YouTube channel The First Take, which premiered on March 10, 2021. The duo gave a televised debut performance of the song at the 63rd Japan Record Awards on December 30, alongside "Kaibutsu", and "Moshi mo Inochi ga Egaketara".

Accolades

Track listing

Digital download and streaming
 – 3:35

CD single
CD
"Kaibutsu" – 3:26
"Yasashii Suisei" – 3:35
"Kaibutsu" (TV Size version) – 1:30
"Yasashii Suisei" (TV Size version) – 1:26
DVD (limited edition)
"TV anime Beastars Season 2 opening non-credit video/Yoasobi "Kaibutsu""
"TV anime Beastars Season 2 ending non-credit video/Yoasobi "Yasashii Suisei""
Blu-ray (fanclub limited edition)
"TV anime Beastars Season 2 opening non-credit video/Yoasobi "Kaibutsu""
"TV anime Beastars Season 2 ending non-credit video/Yoasobi "Yasashii Suisei""
"Tabun" (acoustic session)
"Ano Yume o Nazotte" (acoustic session)

Credits and personnel

Credits adapted from The Book 2 liner notes and YouTube.

Song
 Ayase – producer, songwriter
 Ikura – vocals
 AssH – guitar
 Paru Itagaki – based story writer
 Takayuki Saitō – vocal recording
 Masahiko Fukui – mixing
 Kōhei Kadowaki – cover artwork design

Music video
 Kōhei Kadowaki – director, producer
 Naoki Okada – assistant
 Satoshi Ono – assistant
 Mayuka Kawamura – assistant
 Tokurō Kitamura – assistant
 Kaoru Kimura – assistant
 Ken'ichirō Tachikawa – assistant
 Rina Machida – assistant
 Mayu Watanabe – assistant

Charts

Weekly charts

Monthly charts

Year-end charts

Certifications

Release history

References

External links
 
 English translation of A Leonid, Always

2021 singles
2021 songs
Animated series theme songs
Anime songs
Japanese-language songs
Sony Music Entertainment Japan singles
Yoasobi songs